I Got You may refer to:

"I Got You" (Badfinger song)
"I Got You" (Bebe Rexha song), 2016
"I Got You" (Craig Morgan song), 2005
"I Got You" (Dwight Yoakam song), 1989
"I Got You" (Leona Lewis song), 2009
"I Got You" (Jack Johnson song), 2013
"I Got You" (Nick Carter song), 2003
"I Got You" (Split Enz song), 1979
"I Got You" (Shenandoah song), 1991
"I Got You" (Thompson Square song), 2011
I Got You (I Feel Good) (album), a 1966 album by James Brown
"I Got You (I Feel Good)", a 1964 song by James Brown
"I Got U", a 2014 song by Duke Dumont
"I Got You", a song by Ciara from Jackie
"I Got You", a song by Cimorelli from Renegade
"I Got You", a song by Karmin from Leo Rising
"I Got You", a song by Leona Lewis from I Am (2015)
"I Got You", a song by Mark Picchiotti
"I Got You", a song by Now United
"I Got You", a song by Stone Temple Pilots from No. 4
"I Got You", a song by Train from Save Me, San Francisco
"I Got You", a song by Whitney Houston from I Look to You
"I Got You (At the End of the Century)", a song by Wilco from Being There
"I Got U", a song by DJ Kay Slay from The Streetsweeper, Vol. 1
"I Got U", a song by Selena Gomez & the Scene from Kiss & Tell
I Got You (TV series), a Philippine romantic drama television series

See also
"I Got You Babe", a 1965 song by Sonny & Cher
I've Got You (album), a 1976 album by Gloria Gaynor
I've Got You (song), a 2002 song by Marc Anthony